The Ministry of Rural and Regional Development is a ministry of the Government of Malaysia that is responsible for rural development, regional development, community development, Bumiputera, Orang Asli, rubber industry smallholders, land consolidation, land rehabilitation.

Organisation
Minister of Rural and Regional Development
Deputy Minister of Rural and Regional Development
Secretary-General
Under the Authority of Secretary-General
Corporate Communication Unit
Internal Audit Unit
Legal Unit
Integrity Unit
KPLB State Offices
Deputy Secretary-General (Policy)
Strategic Planning Division
Institute for Rural Advancement
Investments and Subsidiaries Monitoring Division
Rural Community Division
Rural Entrepreneurship Development Division
Community Economy Division
Deputy Secretary-General (Development)
Infrastructure Division
Coordination and Monitoring Division
People's Welfare Division
Land and Regional Development Division
Technical Division
Senior Division Secretary (Management Services)
Human Resource Management Division
Administrative and Asset Management Division
Finance Division
Procurement Division
Account Division
Information Management Division

Federal departments
 Institute for Rural Advancement (INFRA), or Institut Kemajuan Desa. (Official site)
 Community Development Department, or Jabatan Kemajuan Masyarakat (KEMAS). (Official site)
 Department of Orang Asli Development, or Jabatan Kemajuan Orang Asli(JAKOA). (Official site)

Federal agencies
 Council of Trust for the People, or Majlis Amanah Rakyat (MARA). (Official site)
 Kedah Regional Development Authority, or Lembaga Kemajuan Wilayah Kedah (KEDA). (Official site)
 Central Terengganu Development Authority, or Lembaga Kemajuan Terengganu Tengah (KETENGAH). (Official site)
 South Kelantan Development Authority, or Lembaga Kemajuan Kelantan Selatan (KESEDAR). (Official site)
 Southeast Johor Development Authority, or Lembaga Kemajuan Johor Tenggara (KEJORA). (Official site)
 Penang Regional Development Authority, or ''Lembaga Kemajuan Wilayah Pulau Pinang' (PERDA). (Official site)

Key legislation
The Ministry of Rural and Regional Development is responsible for administration of several key Acts:

See also
Minister of Rural and Regional Development (Malaysia)

References

External links

 Ministry of Rural and Regional Development
 

 
Federal ministries, departments and agencies of Malaysia
Malaysia
Malaysia
Malaysia
Rural development ministries